Alexei Kharitonenkov (Russian: Алексей Игоревич Харитоненков) is a Russian-American researcher best known for his discoveries of endocrine functions of Fibroblast Growth Factor 21 (FGF21) and its prospects in developing novel therapies for metabolic diseases. He is also known  for his landmark identification of the Signal-Regulatory family of proteins  (SIRPs), (SIRPs), and their corresponding protein-tyrosine phosphatases, which helped unveil the molecular machinery of immune self-recognition (“do-not-eat me” signal) and their potential for the development of drugs to fight cancer.

Education 
In 1985, Kharitonenkov graduated with an MS in Physics from Moscow State University (MSU), Moscow, Russia. In 1990, he received Ph.D. degree in Biochemistry from MSU, followed by post-doctoral fellowship trainings in molecular biology and signal transduction at Max-Planck-Institute for Biochemistry, Martinsried, Germany (1992-1994).

Career 
Since 1986 to 1992, he was a research fellow at Biochemistry Department, Biology Faculty, Moscow State University, Moscow, Russia. Between 1994 and 1998 he was a staff scientist at the Molecular Biology department of the Max-Planck-Institute for Biochemistry, Martinsried, Germany. Next, he joined Eli Lilly and Company and worked there until 2014.  He then moved to Calibrium; LLC. Upon acquisition of this company, he pursued his research at Novo Nordisk USA in 2016. More recently, Kharitonenkov has been an executive and/or founder of startups within the biopharmaceutical field,  where he has also been an inventor.

He has authored more than 100 peer-reviewed papers, most of them studying aspects of signal transduction, molecular biology, pharmacology, drug discovery and development in the areas of cancer and metabolic diseases.  He is also a contributing author to chapters of review books on endocrine FGFs and metabolism and FGF21 as a therapeutic agent. In 1997 and 2005, he contributed to priming articles describing the structures and functions of SIRPs  and FGF21.

Works 
Kharitonenkov's research papers have been cited over 14,500 times.

According to Google Scholar, his most cited papers are:

 Kharitonenkov A, Chen Z, Sures I, Wang H, Schilling J, and Ullrich A. A family of proteins that inhibits signaling through tyrosine kinase receptors. Nature 386:181-6 (1997)  doi:10.1038/386181a0. PMID 9062191 Cited 726 times.
 Kharitonenkov, Alexei; Shiyanova, Tatiyana L.; Koester, Anja; Ford, Amy M.; Micanovic, Radmila; Galbreath, Elizabeth J.; Sandusky, George E.; Hammond, Lisa J.; Moyers, Julie S.; Owens, Rebecca A.; Gromada, Jesper; Brozinick, Joseph T.; Hawkins, Eric D.; Wroblewski, Victor J.; Li, De-Shan (2005-06).  "FGF-21 as a novel metabolic regulator". The Journal of Clinical Investigation. 115 (6): 1627–1635. doi:10.1172/JCI23606.     ISSN 0021-9738. PMC 1088017. PMID 15902306. Cited 2241 times.

 Coskun T, Bina HA, Schneider MA, Dunbar JD, Hu CC, Chen Y, Moller DE, and Kharitonenkov A. Fibroblast growth factor 21 corrects obesity in mice, Endocrinology 149:6018-27 (2008) doi:10.1210/en.2008-0816. PMID 18687777 Cited 1104 times.
 Fisher, Ffolliott M.; Kleiner, Sandra; Douris, Nicholas; Fox, Elliott C.; Mepani, Rina J.; Verdeguer, Francisco; Wu, Jun; Kharitonenkov, Alexei; Flier, Jeffrey S.; Maratos-Flier, Eleftheria; Spiegelman, Bruce M. "FGF21 regulates PGC-1 and browning of white adipose tissues in adaptive thermogenesis". Genes & Development. 26 (3): 271-281 (2012). doi:10.1101/gad.177857.111. PMID 22302939. Cited 1449 times.

Significance 
The discovery of FGF21's metabolic action by Kharitonenkov el. al. in 2005, and 2012, represents an important breakthrough in the search for pharmacological alternatives to current treatments of diabetes and other metabolic diseases, as acknowledged in prominent subject reviews, and reference books. Kharitonenkov’s and others' research on FGF21 mostly advocates for an angiocentric mode of action; However, recent reports are suggestive of the brain being a primary target where this hormone would first produce its effects. This poses some uncertainty on peripheral vs. centrallly-driven mechanism of acton of this novel metabolic regulator.

References 

Russian biochemists

Year of birth missing (living people)
Living people
Eli Lilly and Company people
Russian emigrants to the United States